Yuan Francisco (born February 11, 2010) is a Filipino child actor & commercial model.

Acting career 
Yuan aka Pao-Pao started in print and TV commercials. He became a household name after he appeared in a series of commercials by a fabric softener and since guested in various TV shows. One of his most significant roles on TV was Encantadia 2016, where he played Pao-Pao, the bearer of the 5th gem.

Filmography

Accolades

References 
 Yuan 'Pao Pao' Francisco, na-discover sa mall Retrieved 2017-06-14
 Meet Yuan Francisco, bearer of the fifth gem in Encantadia Retrieved 2017-06-14

Specific

Filipino male child actors
2010 births
Living people
GMA Network personalities
Tagalog people